Buskirk is a surname of Dutch origin. Notable people with the surname include:

People
Samuel Hamilton Buskirk (1820–1879), American lawyer, politician and justice of the Indiana Supreme Court
Ruth Buskirk, professor at the University of Texas at Austin
Harold Van Buskirk (1894–1980), American architect and fencing champion
Jacob Van Buskirk (1760–1834), merchant, judge and political figure in Nova Scotia
John van Buskirk (born 1972), US football coach and a former player
Pieter Van Buskirk (1665–1738), the first settler in the Constable Hook area of Bayonne, New Jersey
Clarence A. Buskirk (1842–1926), Indiana Attorney General (1874–1878) and promoter of Christian Science

Fictional Character
Kuzzey Buskirk, a fictional character in the anime Gundam SEED

Places
United States
Van Buskirk, Wisconsin, unincorporated community
Buskirk Bridge, wooden covered bridge, in Buskirk hamlet in the town of Hoosick, New York State
Van Buskirk Island, man-made island in the Hackensack River in Oradell, New Jersey, United States
Buskirk, Kentucky, small town in rural Pike County, Kentucky

Dutch-language surnames
Surnames of Dutch origin